Aulacophora analis is a species of leaf beetle in the genus Aulacophora. It was first described by Friedrich Weber in 1801.

References

Aulacophora
Beetles described in 1801
Beetles of Asia